Tasagar (Taahağar) is a rural locality (a selo), the only inhabited locality, and the administrative center of Tasagarsky Rural Okrug of Vilyuysky District in the Sakha Republic, Russia, located  from Vilyuysk, the administrative center of the district. Its population as of the 2010 Census was 544, of whom 277 were male and 267 female, down from 571 as recorded during the 2002 Census.

References

Notes

Sources
Official website of the Sakha Republic. Registry of the Administrative-Territorial Divisions of the Sakha Republic. Vilyuysky District. 

Rural localities in Vilyuysky District